is a 1987 Japanese OVA.

Plot
Koichiro Kamishiro is an assistant professor at a university who is highly regarded in the field of archaeology and travels around the world to find various antiquities as well as the "Message of God" which relates to the mysterious Hih Tribe. One day while investigating the ruins in the Middle East, he finds a strange cube-shaped stone despite running into several problems. While investigating the mysterious stone, he receives a visit from Miyabi Koto, the daughter of his former teacher. Initially, Kamishiro is not too keen on the idea, but after listening to Miyabi's story, he decides that it is well worth investigating and decides to get involved. However, he was unaware that this would lead to a major revelation involving the "Ten Commandments", a book of divine prophecy. As he along with Isao, Mina, Ginji and Miyabi travel across Japan repeatedly running into the Japanese government, CIA, KGB and even messengers of the Ten Commandments who will stop at no cost to get the Crystal Triangle back, he comes to a realization that the Crystal Triangle may contain the Message of God he was looking for, which is the potential 11th commandment that will prevent the Earth's destruction.

Cast
Masane Tsukayama: Koichiro Kamishiro
Toshiko Fujita: Juno Cassidy
Yusaku Yara: Grigori Yefimovich / Urga
Yuriko Yamamoto: Miyabi Koto / Himiko
Kazuki Yao: Isao Murakami
Mayumi Sho: Mina Katsuki
Ichiro Nagai: Kukai
Seizō Katō: The Old Man of Hakodate
Yuzuru Fujimoto: Hih Tribe Priest
Norio Wakamoto: Ginji Iwagami
Kan Tokumaru: Yoshioka
Banjo Ginga: Dàrén
Issei Futamata: Genpo
Shinya Otaki: Numata
Yuji Mikimoto: Ubanishad Master
Michitaka Kobayashi: Minato
Masaru Ikeda: Narrator

Production
Crystal Triangle was released in Japan on VHS on July 1, 1987, and August 26, 1987, for its LaserDisc release. A DVD release by SME Visual Works (now Aniplex) was released on August 21, 2002. The anime was animated by Studio Live and was produced by Animate Film and Sony Music Entertainment Japan. Seiji Okuda handled the OVA's direction, while Toyoo Ashida and Kazuko Tadano were character designers in the OVA. The OVA was released in the
U.S. on VHS and LaserDisc by Central Park Media under their U.S. Manga Corps label in 1993. The U.S. release has since gone out of print following 
Central Park Media's bankruptcy in 2009.

Note: The English dubbed version was dubbed by the Japanese voice actors.

References

External links
 

1980s adventure films
1987 anime OVAs
1987 films
Animated adventure films
Japanese adventure films